Valberg may refer to:

People
 Birgitta Valberg (1916–2014), Swedish actress
 J.J. Valberg (1936), British-American philosopher 
 Robert Valberg (1884–1955), Austrian stage and film actor

Places
 Valberg, a purpose-built ski station in Provence-Alpes-Côte d'Azur, France
 Valberg, Nordland, a village and former municipality in Nordland county, Norway
 Valberg Church, a church in Vestvågøy municipality, Nordland county, Norway
 Valberg, Vestfold, a village in Stokke municipality, Vestfold county, Norway

See also
 Vålberg, a village in Karlstad Municipality, Värmland County, Sweden